Denys Hennadiyovych Prokopenko (born 27 June 1991) is a Ukrainian military officer, a Lieutenant Colonel in the National Guard of Ukraine, and Commander of the Azov Regiment. Since 2014 until his capture in May 2022 by Russian forces, he fought against Russia and pro-Russian separatist forces in the Donbas in the ongoing Russo–Ukrainian War.

In response to the 2022 Russian invasion of Ukraine, Prokopenko rose as a leader defending Mariupol from the Russian siege. For his leadership role on the frontlines of the war, he was awarded the title Hero of Ukraine in March 2022.

Prokopenko is also known as Redis an old football fan nickname which became his military call sign. His subordinates are reported to address him informally as “Brother Redis” or “Comrade Redis” ((literal translation - “Friend Redis”) ).

Early life
Denis Prokopenko is of ethnic Finnic Karelian ancestry. His grandfather was the sole member of his family to survive serving in the Finnish Defence Forces when the Soviet Union invaded Finland in the Winter War of 1939 and 1940. The Finns fought off the Red Army to preserve national independence, but the resulting Moscow Peace Treaty forced Finland to cede to the Soviet Union much of historic Finnish Karelia—leaving the displaced inhabitants and their descendants with questions about the return of their lost homeland. Consequently, the young Prokopenko today considers his fight to defend Ukraine against Russian imperialism from Moscow a personal matter, closely intertwined with his own family history:

He graduated from the Department of Germanic Philology at Kyiv National Linguistic University, where he earned a degree with a specialty in teaching English. He also played sports, and was one of the enthusiastic football fans (known as "ultras") of the football club Dynamo Kyiv.

Military career

From 11 July 2014 Prokopenko has participated in the War in Donbas, initially as an enlisted soldier and then as leader of a platoon and a company. In a July 2016 interview he described improvements in the military capabilities of his troops: “Although we lost a lot of experienced guys from the old squad, we've grown in quantity and quality. Discipline and combat efficiency have improved. We used to run with bobby pistols and sawn-off shots; now we have opportunities to work with tactical tank groups, armored vehicles, artillery support. We gradually developed our military science doctrine—starting with practice, not theory. In the course of training and fighting, the lads mastered tactics and small arms proficiency. Many new possibilities opened for us: we can operate independently on the frontlines, free of other subunits that constantly let us down in combat operations.” In July 2017 he  was promoted to the rank of major and given control of the Azov Regiment, becoming the youngest commander in the Armed Forces of Ukraine.

Siege of Mariupol
 
Following the 2022 Russian invasion of Ukraine, Prokopenko recorded a video message on 7 March 2022 in which he called for closing the skies over Ukraine to help avert humanitarian collapse in Mariupol, since “the enemy is breaking the rules of the war by shelling the civilian people and destroying the infrastructure of the city; the enemy is subjecting Mariupol to another genocide.”

On 19 March 2022, President Volodymyr Zelenskyy awarded the title Hero of Ukraine to the commanders of two units that led the defense of Mariupol: Prokopenko and the commander of the 36th Separate Marine Brigade, Colonel Volodymyr Baranyuk. Major Denis Prokopenko received the highest honor “for bravery, for effective tactics to repel enemy attacks, and for protection of the hero city of Mariupol.”

On 12 April 2022, Prokopenko appeared in a video message, to report on charges that Russian chemical weapons had been dropped onto Mariupol in a drone attack: “yesterday the occupiers used a poisonous substance of unknown origin against military and civilians in Mariupol. The epicenter of the attack was not near the people, so contact with the substance was minimal, which possibly saved lives—but there are still consequences. Currently it's impossible to find out what substance poisoned people, because we are under complete blockade, and the site of the attack is under fire by the Russians to hide evidence of their crime.” Regardless of the sudden international focus on the chemical attack, he went on to claim that thousands of civilians in the city had been killed and continued to be slaughtered by constant ongoing Russian airstrikes, naval bombardment, heavy flamethrower systems, artillery, and phosphorus munitions. On 13 April 2022, it was confirmed by the official Twitter account of the Azov regiment that Prokopenko was promoted to the rank of lieutenant colonel.

On 11 May 2022, Pope Francis met in the Vatican with the wives of Azov Regiment soldiers Kateryna Prokopenko and Yulia Fedosyuk. On 16 May 2022, a social media post was released by Prokopenko stating: "In order to save lives, the entire Mariupol garrison is implementing the approved decision of the Supreme Military Command and hopes for the support of the Ukrainian people." This statement follows Russia's decision to "evacuate" wounded Ukrainian soldiers from the Azovstal plant and for them to be taken to the DPR-controlled town of Novoazovsk for treatment.

Prisoner of war
On 20 May 2022, he surrendered to the Russian military along with the last defenders of the Azovstal plant, after stating in a final video message on Telegram: "The higher military command has given the order to save the lives of the soldiers of our garrison and to stop defending the city." Since the Russian Duma was attempting to classify Azov as a terrorist organization, the question of whether Russia considered Prokopenko as a prisoner of war (POW) remained in doubt. On 24 May, his wife Kateryna confirmed that he was in Russian captivity and that she had been able to talk to him on the phone.

Release
On 21 September 2022, Prokopenko was released in a prisoner swap. Under the agreement, Prokopenko and four other top Ukrainian commanders from the Azovstal siege will be required to stay in Turkey until the end of the war.

Awards

 The title Hero of Ukraine conferred with the distinction of the "Order of the Gold Star" (19 March 2022) – for personal courage and heroism shown in defense of the state sovereignty and territorial integrity of Ukraine, and fidelity to his military oath 
 Order of Bohdan Khmelnytsky, III Class (24 August 2019) – for major personal contributions to strengthening the national defense capabilities of the Ukrainian nation, courage shown during hostilities, exemplary performance of official duties and high degree of professionalism 
 Medal For Military Service to Ukraine (25 March 2015) – awarded to Junior Lieutenant Prokopenko for individual bravery and high degree of professionalism shown in defense of the state sovereignty and territorial integrity of Ukraine

Personal life
He is married to Kateryna.

Notes

References

1991 births
Living people
Ukrainian nationalists
Ukrainian anti-communists
Kyiv National Linguistic University alumni
Ukrainian people of Finnish descent
Ukrainian people of Karelian descent
Ukrainian military leaders
Pro-Ukrainian people of the 2014 pro-Russian unrest in Ukraine
People of the National Guard of Ukraine
Ukrainian military personnel of the war in Donbas
Recipients of the title of Hero of Ukraine
Recipients of the Order of Bohdan Khmelnytsky, 3rd class
Recipients of the Order of Gold Star (Ukraine)
Ukrainian military personnel of the 2022 Russian invasion of Ukraine
Prisoners of war held by Russia
Siege of Mariupol